Sheraton New Orleans is a 49-story,  tall skyscraper that is located at 500 Canal Street in the Central Business District of New Orleans, Louisiana. The Sheraton is the 6th tallest building in New Orleans, and the hotel is part of Marriott International.

The hotel was evacuated when Hurricane Katrina struck the city in 2005. There were 1,000 people in the hotel during the storm, and they were taken to the Sheraton Park Central in Dallas, TX. Only two of the 1,100 rooms in the hotel suffered damage, and most of the rooms were being occupied by contractors, medical professionals, and members of the press.

See also
List of tallest buildings in Louisiana

References

External links

Sheraton New Orleans, Official Website

Skyscraper hotels in New Orleans
Hotel buildings completed in 1982
Hotels established in 1982
Sheraton hotels
1982 establishments in Louisiana